Zehneria tridactyla is an annual climbing herb currently accepted has part of the Cucurbitaceae family.

Taxonomy 
Melothria tridactyla found in the various East and Central African countries was differentiated from the similar Zehneri thwaitesii found in Ceylon by Hooker in Flora of Tropical Africa in 1871. But it was later delimited to Z. thwaitesii, lately studies have shown a different taxa evolutionary lineage between the Asian Zehneria and its African counterpart.

Morphology 
Smooth or scabrid stems and branches. Leaves are triangular in shape, 3.5 × 10 cm long; 3 lobed with lateral lobe placed at right angles with the middle lobe which is the longest. Petioles are long or short.

Distribution 
Plant is native to Tropical Africa including the island of Madagascar.

References

Flora of West Tropical Africa
tridactyla